Plastic Box is a compilation box set by the post-punk band Public Image Ltd released in 1999 as a limited edition, but re-released for a standard release on 14 December 2009. It comprises four discs covering the band's activity from their debut in 1978 until their hiatus beginning in 1992.

Packaging and title
The album title Plastic Box is a reference to the band's album Metal Box. Both Plastic Box and Metal Box are named simply after the type of packaging; Plastic Box was released in a standard 4CD fatbox case. The album was probably going to be titled differently as the original idea was for the album to be released in a metal box, but the Virgin Records budget was not big enough. The album cover is similar to the band's 1986 album, the title of which originally depended on the format, the most popular title being Album.

Content
Public Image: First Issue is represented with 7 of its 8 tracks, with only "Fodderstompf" excluded. Also included is "Public Image" B-side "The Cowboy Song".
Metal Box is represented with 10 of its 12 tracks, four of them are in different versions, three of these in a BBC John Peel session and the remaining track, "Swan Lake", in the form of its 12" remix as "Death Disco". The "Death Disco" B-sides "No Birds Do Sing" and "1/2 Mix"/"Megga Mix" are also included along with "Memories" B-side "Another".
The Flowers of Romance is represented in its entirety, with the single version of "Flowers of Romance". Also included is "Flowers of Romance" B-side "Home Is Where the Heart Is" and rarity "Pied Piper".
This Is What You Want... This Is What You Get is represented in its entirety, with a previously unreleased LP remix of "This Is Not a Love Song" and the 7" version of "Bad Life". Other tracks from this era include "Blue Water" and "Bad Life" B-side "Question Mark".
Album is represented with 6 of its 7 tracks, with only "Bags" excluded.
Happy? is represented with 3 of its 8 tracks: "Seattle", "Angry" and the US 12" mix of "The Body". Also included is "Seattle" B-side "Selfish Rubbish".
9 is represented with 4 of its 10 tracks, with a UK 12" Remix version of "Warrior". "Don't Ask Me", a standalone single from 1990 released to promote The Greatest Hits, So Far, is also included along with "Criminal" from the Point Break soundtrack.
That What Is Not is represented with 6 of its 10 tracks, 4 of them from a BBC Mark Goodier session.

Track listing

Disc one
 "Public Image"
 "The Cowboy Song"
 "Theme"
 "Religion I"
 "Religion II"
 "Annalisa"
 "Low Life"
 "Attack"
 "Poptones" (BBC John Peel Session)
 "Careering" (BBC John Peel Session)
 "Chant" (BBC John Peel Session)
 "Death Disco" (12" Remix)
 "1/2 Mix Megamix"
 "No Birds Do Sing"
 "Memories"

Disc two

 "Another"
 "Albatross"
 "Socialist"
 "The Suit"
 "Bad Baby"
 "Radio 4"
 "Pied Piper"
 "Flowers of Romance" (Single Version)
 "Four Enclosed Walls"
 "Phenagen"
 "Track 8"
 "Hymie's Him"
 "Under The House"
 "Banging The Door"
 "Go Back"
 "Francis Massacre"
 "Home Is Where The Heart Is"

Disc three
 "This Is Not a Love Song" (LP Remix)
 "Blue Water"
 "Bad Life" (7" edit)
 "Question Mark"
 "Solitaire"
 "Tie Me To The Length Of That"
 "Where Are You?"
 "The Pardon"
 "1981"
 "The Order Of Death"
 "F.F.F."
 "Rise"
 "Fishing"
 "Round"
 "Home"
 "Ease"

Disc four
 "Seattle"
 "Angry"
 "The Body" (US 12" Mix)
 "Selfish Rubbish"
 "Disappointed"
 "Happy"
 "Warrior" (12" Extended Version)
 "USLS 1"
 "Don't Ask Me"
 "Criminal"
 "Luck's Up"
 "God"
 "Cruel" (BBC Mark Goodier Session)
 "Acid Drops" (BBC Mark Goodier Session)
 "Love Hope" (BBC Mark Goodier Session)
 "Think Tank" (BBC Mark Goodier Session)

References

External links 
 The Independent review

1999 compilation albums
Public Image Ltd albums
Virgin Records compilation albums